"Shadow Play" is episode 62 of the American television anthology series The Twilight Zone. It originally aired on May 5, 1961 on CBS.

Opening narration

Plot
A jury finds Adam Grant guilty of murder, and the judge sentences him to death. Grant laughs with despair, then exclaims that he refuses to die again. He frantically tries to tell those present – including district attorney Henry Ritchie and newspaper editor Paul Carson – that he is dreaming, and if he is executed they will all cease to exist. Locked up on death row, Grant describes the experience of dying in the electric chair, to fellow prisoner Jiggs in graphic detail.

Later, a drunk Carson shows up at Ritchie's house. He has been speaking to Grant, and fears the convict might be telling the truth. Ritchie's wife Carol, annoyed by Carson's outburst, goes to bed early, telling her husband that there are steaks almost ready in the oven. Carson argues to Ritchie that their lives seem impossibly perfect, and encourages him to explore his own doubts.

Back at the prison, Grant waits for Ritchie to arrive, noting the implausibility of Jiggs having a watch to tell him the time. Ritchie comes, and they have a conversation Grant has claimed to have had before with other DAs, enough times to mouth the man's words as he says them. Ritchie asks Grant why he cares about dying if it's all a dream, and Grant explains that he's tormented by having this same nightmare every night. As Ritchie leaves, Grant tries to prove that they're in a dream, by predicting that the steak Ritchie's wife had cooked will be something else. Ritchie rushes home, and finds a roast in the oven.

Jiggs suggests to Grant that he try to get a psychiatric exemption from execution. To prove his sanity to Jiggs, Grant points out logical errors accepted as normal by those around him, such as the fact that his trial and execution are happening on the same day. Meanwhile, at Ritchie's home, he and Carson wait for midnight, debating the likelihood that the execution time matches the one shown in movies.

As Grant waits to be taken to the electric chair, Father Beaman visits him. Grant vaguely recalls him as a real priest who died when he was a boy. He further remembers that Carson is really the young priest who replaced Beaman, but struggles to place Ritchie. Carson finally persuades Ritchie that either Grant is right or he's insane, so he calls the governor for a stay of execution. But the call comes seconds too late, Grant is executed, and the world blinks out.

Grant finds himself back in the courtroom. He is being convicted and sentenced to death for murder, again. The same people surround him in the courtroom, but their identities and roles have changed: Jiggs is now the judge, Carson is the jury foreman, Phillips is Grant's public defender.

Closing narration

Production notes 
Although no source material appears on screen, the episode is likely adapted from writer Charles Beaumont's short story "Traumerei" (which roughly translates from the German as "daydream" or "reverie") which originally appeared in the February, 1956 issue of Infinity Science Fiction. Beaumont's teleplay features passages taken wholly and unchanged from his earlier story.

Adaptations

This episode was remade under the same title as part of the 1980s series in which Peter Coyote played Adam Grant.

It was also adapted for radio under the same title as part of The Twilight Zone Radio Dramas in which Ernie Hudson played Adam Grant.

See also
 "12:01 P.M."
 Allegory of the Cave
 Zhuangzi dreamed he was a butterfly
 Dark City
 End Day
 Groundhog Day
 Edge of Tomorrow
 Haunter
 "Monday", an episode of The X-Files

References

DeVoe, Bill. (2008). Trivia from The Twilight Zone. Albany, GA: Bear Manor Media. 
Grams, Martin. (2008). The Twilight Zone: Unlocking the Door to a Television Classic. Churchville, MD: OTR Publishing.

External links

1961 American television episodes
The Twilight Zone (1959 TV series season 2) episodes
Television episodes about nightmares
Television shows written by Charles Beaumont
Television shows based on short fiction
Television episodes about dreams